Sobral Regional Airport , named after Luciano de Arruda Coelho is the airport serving Sobral, Brazil.

History
The airport opened on April 1, 2022. It replaced the former airport of Sobral, Cel. Virgílio Távora Airport.

Airlines and destinations

Access

See also
List of airports in Brazil

References

External links

Airports in Ceará